The Imperial Valley Press (originally known as the Imperial Press) is a daily newspaper printed outside of the Imperial Valley, California. It was owned by Schurz Communications of South Bend, Indiana from 1965 to 2015. It is owned by Imperial Valley Media; shareholders include Rhode Island Suburban Newspapers.

The Imperial Valley Press features local news from all communities of the Imperial Valley and the Mexicali, Baja California area, as well as San Diego County and portions of southwestern Arizona. The newspaper focuses on local news, sports and opinion pieces. Perhaps one of the best-read features of the paper is its "Probe" column, which solicits reader participation and then attempts to answer questions and address other concerns.

History
The Imperial Press debuted on April 20, 1901, under editor and manager Henry C. Reed. Appearing each Saturday, it served the recently founded community of Imperial, California, then part of San Diego County. The addition of the tagline, “Water is king—here is its Kingdom,” to the masthead in June signified an ongoing concern of both the paper and its readership: the availability of water within agricultural areas of southeast California. Within its first year, the Imperial Press merged with a Los Angeles monthly publication called the Imperial Farmer to become the Imperial Press and Farmer on November 2, 1901, with new editor and manager Edgar F. Howe at the helm. Though returning to its original title, the Imperial Press, on March 28, 1903, the focus on water remained. While noting the availability of water in the Imperial Valley, Howe worried that the water rights for “most of the country rests on a basis of speculation as to what the national government will do in the coming years.”

In March 1906, the paper moved to nearby El Centro where, under the leadership of editor and publisher Felix G. Havens, it expanded both its potential readership and its title, becoming the Imperial Valley Press and the Imperial Press on March 3, 1906. Though no longer claiming the value of water within its masthead, the paper continued to argue for water rights, “advocating prompt and decisive action to give the Reclamation Service the power to control the entire water sheds of the rivers of the arid land states.” Of particular concern were private interests controlling access to the Colorado River. The importance of such issues to local politics increased with the founding of Imperial County on August 7, 1907. The paper, its title now shortened to the Imperial Valley Press, strayed from its normal weekly publishing schedule to put out a number of “Extra” editions in late July 1907. These extras addressed the upcoming elections that would establish the county seat along with the potential candidates to fill the new offices. Following the excitement surrounding the establishment of Imperial County, the Imperial Valley Press returned to its Saturday publishing date until September 30, 1911, when the paper officially became a daily. The Imperial Valley Press continues to be published today, including an online edition.

Other publications
The Imperial Valley Press publishes Adelante Valle a Spanish-language weekly.

References

External links
 Imperial Valley Press
 Imperial Valley Press at Schurz Communications
 California Digital Newspaper Collection

Daily newspapers published in California
1901 establishments in California
El Centro, California